Mougins School is an international school situated in Mougins, France. It was established in 1964 and moved to its present site on the high technology park of Sophia Antipolis in 1987. The school was purchased by international education company Globeducate in 2021.

Facilities
The purpose-built campus, situated in a pine forest, provides indoor and outdoor sporting facilities, science laboratories, library, arts, and theatre facilities.

Academic organisation
The School has a one-form entry system educating students aged from three to eighteen representing over thirty countries. Studies are based on the National Curriculum for England modified to meet the needs of an international market. Tests are taken as in the UK at 7, 11 and 14, followed by the IGCSE, GCSE 'AS' and 'A’ Level examinations, on completion of which students move on to university education in Europe or the USA. ESL is available.

Extra curricular activities
These include art, volleyball, football, gymnastics, badminton, orienteering, guitar, piano, choir and dramatic art.

Parent and student representation
A parent–teacher association assures social activities for parents and students alike, as well as fund-raising. There is also an active student government that voices the concerns of the students to the faculty.

External links 
 

British international schools in France
Educational institutions established in 1964
1964 establishments in France